Frederick Behne (October 3, 1873 – February 11, 1918) was a fireman first class serving in the United States Navy who received the Medal of Honor for bravery.

Biography
On January 25, 1905, a manhole plate blew out of boiler D. For his actions he received the Medal on March 20, 1905.

Behne later reached the rank of Chief Watertender. He died of pneumonia on February 11, 1918, while serving at a naval base in Brest, France, and was initially buried there. He was re-buried two years later at Hackensack Cemetery in New Jersey.

Medal of Honor citation
Rank and organization: Fireman First Class, U.S. Navy. Born: 3 October 1873, Lodi, N.J. Accredited to: New Jersey. G.O. No.: 182, 20 March 1905.

Citation:

On board the U.S.S. Iowa, 25 January 1905. Following the blowing out of the manhole plate of boiler D of that vessel, Behne displayed extraordinary heroism in the resulting action.

See also

List of Medal of Honor recipients in non-combat incidents

References

 

1873 births
1918 deaths
United States Navy Medal of Honor recipients
United States Navy chiefs
People from Lodi, New Jersey
Non-combat recipients of the Medal of Honor